Perlucidibaca is a genus of Gram-negative, oxidase-positive and catalase-negative, motile bacteria with a polar flagellum, which belong to the class  Gammaproteobacteria.

References

	

Moraxellaceae
Monotypic bacteria genera
Bacteria genera